= Café Clover =

American restaurant in New York City

Coordinates: 40.729194°N 74.002780°W

Cafe Clover
- Interactive map of Cafe Clover

Restaurant information
- Established: 2015
- Closed: 2020
- Location: 10 Downing Street, New York City, New York, 10014, United States
- Website: www.cafeclovernyc.com

Café Clover was an American restaurant in New York City which opened in 2015. Its menu was health and plant-focused.

== History ==
In 2017 a food market affiliated with the restaurant dubbed Clover Grocery opened nearby.

The restaurant closed in 2020 during the COVID-19 pandemic, and remained closed in October 2021. Before it closed, TimeOut described its food as "health-focused plates like chutney-topped cauliflower steak and quinoa tagliatelli studded with beet greens and sunflower kernels," and the decor as 1970s styled.

== Ratings and reviews ==
In her review, published in The New Yorker, Amelia Lester gave credit to the restaurant for making the most of its oddly-shaped floor plan, though she criticized the restaurant for being overly focused on portion size.
